The 20th Legislative Assembly of Quebec was the provincial legislature in Quebec, Canada that existed from August 17, 1936, to October 25, 1939. The Union Nationale led by Maurice Duplessis was the governing party for the first time ever.

Seats per political party

 After the 1936 elections

Member list

This was the list of members of the Legislative Assembly of Quebec that were elected in the 1936 election:

Other elected MLAs

Other MLAs were elected during the term in by-elections

 Joseph-Emile Perron, Union Nationale, Beauce, March 17, 1937 
 Philippe Adam, Union Nationale, Bagot, February 16, 1938 
 Antonio Talbot, Union Nationale, Chicoutimi, May 25, 1938 
 Louis Fitch, Union Nationale, Montréal-Saint-Louis, November 2, 1938 
 Henri Gérin, Union Nationale, Stanstead, November 2, 1938

Cabinet Ministers

 Prime Minister and Executive Council President: Maurice Duplessis
 Agriculture: Bona Dussault
 Mines, Hunting and Fishing: Onésime Gagnon (1936)
 Mines and Fishing: Onésime Gagnon (1936–1939)
 Colonization: Henri Lemaître Auger
 Labour: William Tremblay
 Public Works: John Samuel Bourque
 Lands and Forests: Oscar Drouin (1936–1937), Maurice Duplessis (1937–1938), John Samuel Bourque (1938–1939)
 Health: Albiny Paquette (1936–1939)
 Roads: François-Joseph Leduc (1936–1938), Maurice Duplessis (1938), Anatole Carignan (1938–1939)
 Municipal Affairs, Industry and Commerce: Joseph Bilodeau
 Attorney General: Maurice Duplessis
 Provincial Secretary: Albiny Paquette
 Treasurer: Martin Beattie Fisher
 Members without portfolios: Antonio Élie, Thomas Chapais (1936–1939), Gilbert Layton, Thomas Joseph Coonan

New electoral districts

The electoral map was reformed in 1939 just prior to the elections later that year.

 Châteauguay and Laprairie were merged to form Châteauguay-Laprairie while Napierville which was merged with Laprairie was merged with Saint-Jean to form Saint-Jean-Napierville.
 Kamouraska and Rivière-du-Loup were merged to form Kamouraska-Rivière-du-Loup
 Westmount was split into two new ridings: Montréal-Notre-Dame-de-Grâce and Montréal-Outremont.
 Montréal-Jeanne-Mance was formed from parts of Maisonneuve, Montréal-Mercier and Montréal-Dorion.
 Montréal-Saint-Georges was renamed Westmount-Saint-Georges.
 Richelieu and Verchères was merged to form Richelieu-Vercheres
 Vaudreuil and Soulanges were merged to form Vaudreuil-Soulanges.

References
 1936 election results
 List of Historical Cabinet Ministers

Notes

20